Murray Lewinter (December 12, 1926 – July 2, 2016) was an American politician who served in the New York State Assembly from The Bronx's 6th district from 1961 to 1966.

He died of Alzheimer's disease on July 2, 2016, in Queens, New York City, New York at age 89.

References

1926 births
2016 deaths
Democratic Party members of the New York State Assembly